The ancient Egyptian Two Whips with Shen ring hieroglyph, Gardiner sign listed no. S23 is a portrayal of the Shen ring with two Egyptian flails-(Crook and flail); it is a member of the Gardiner subset for "crowns, dress, staves, etc".

In the Egyptian language, the hieroglyph is used as an ideogram or determinative for words meaning to unite. In the language it is used for dm(dj)-(dmḏ).

A second form of the hieroglyph uses only one whip and shen ring, and implies 'opposite', the opposite of "to unite".

See also

Gardiner's Sign List#S. Crowns, Dress, Staves, etc.
List of Egyptian hieroglyphs
Shen ring

References

Betrò, 1995. Hieroglyphics: The Writings of Ancient Egypt, Betrò, Maria Carmela, c. 1995, 1996-(English), Abbeville Press Publishers, New York, London, Paris (hardcover)
Budge, 1991.  A Hieroglyphic Dictionary to the Book of the Dead, E.A.Wallace Budge, Dover edition, 1991; Original: c 1911 as: "A Hieroglyphic Vocabulary to the Theban Recension of the Book of the Dead with an Index to All the English Equivalents of the Egyptian Words", (Kegan Paul, etc. Ltd, London, publisher). Dover: (softcover)
Budge. The Rosetta Stone, E. A. Wallis Budge, (Dover Publications), c 1929, Dover edition(unabridged), 1989. (softcover)
Budge, 1978, (1920).  An Egyptian Hieroglyphic Dictionary, E. A. Wallis Budge, (Dover Publications), c 1978, (c 1920), Dover edition, c 1978; cliv-(154) and 1314 pp. (In two volumes) (softcover)

Egyptian hieroglyphs: crowns-dress-staves